The 2016 Euro Beach Soccer Cup was the fifteenth edition of the Euro Beach Soccer Cup, one of Europe's main, regular international beach soccer championships, organised every two years by Beach Soccer Worldwide (BSWW). It was held in June 2016, in Belgrade, Serbia, the first time the country has hosted and played in a BSWW sanctioned event.

Eight nations took part which were the best nations in Europe based on their finish in last years 2015 Euro Beach Soccer League, plus hosts Serbia. France, however, pulled out and were replaced by Hungary. The competition reverted to being a straight knock-out tournament instead of involving a group stage first as in the previous edition in 2014, with classifying matches to determine the final standings of those who didn't reach the final.

Spain were the defending champions, accepting the invitation to play, but lost in the quarter finals, ultimately finishing seventh.

Portugal won the championship, claiming their seventh crown, their first in 10 years. Italy reached their first final, finishing as runners-up.

Participating teams
The following teams took part in the tournament.

 Bold indicates champion for that year. Italic indicates host for that year.
* = hosts of this year
1Note: 1998-2010 annual basis (excluding 2000), biennial basis post-2010.

Results
All times are CEST (UTC+2)

Main tournament bracket

Classification matches

Quarter-finals
The winners proceeded on in the main tournament into the semi-finals. The losers progressed into a series of classifying matches to determine the standings of fifth down to eighth place.

Semi-finals

Main tournament

Classification (5th to 8th place)

Seventh place play-off
The losers of the classifying semi finals contested 7th place.

Fifth place play-off
The winners of the classifying semi finals contested 5th place.

Third place play-off
The losers of the main tournament semi finals contested 3rd place.

Final
The winners of the main tournament semi finals contested the championship final.

Winners

Awards

Final standings

References

Euro Beach Soccer Cup
2016 in beach soccer
2016 in Serbian sport
International association football competitions hosted by Serbia
International sports competitions in Belgrade
June 2016 sports events in Europe
2010s in Belgrade